is a former Japanese football player. She played for the Japan national team.

National team career
Hase was born on October 25, 1956. In June 1981, she was selected Japan national team for 1981 AFC Championship. At this competition, on June 7, she debuted against Chinese Taipei. This was the Japan team's first match in an International A Match. She played in two matches at this championship. In September, she also played against Italy. However Japan was defeated in this match by a score of 0–9. This was the biggest defeat in the history of the Japan national team. She played three games for Japan in 1981.

National team statistics

References

1956 births
Living people
Japanese women's footballers
Japan women's international footballers
Women's association football goalkeepers